Leo Gibson (born August 9, 1983) is a Liberian footballer who currently plays for and is the head coach for the Kansas City Comets in the MASL.

Career

College
Gibson was born in Monrovia, Liberia, but came to the United States in 2002, having previously played for the Monrovia Black Star youth team in the Liberian Premier League. He played college soccer at King College in Tennessee in 2002 and 2003.

Professional
Gibson had a trial with the Dallas Burn of Major League Soccer in 2004., before eventually signing with the Minnesota Thunder of the USL First Division in 2005. However, a hand injury kept him from playing any games that season.  He remained with the Minnesota through the end of 2008, becoming an integral part of the team in the 2006 and 2007 seasons especially.

In 2007, the California Cougars of the Major Indoor Soccer League selected Gibson with the 40th pick in the MISL Draft. He informed the team that he preferred to not play in California and the Cougars traded his rights to the Detroit Ignition on November 15, 2007 in exchange for a first round pick in the 2008 Supplemental Draft.

On March 17, 2009, having been released by Minnesota, Gibson signed for the Cleveland City Stars for an undisclosed transfer fee. He played 27 games and scored 2 goals for Cleveland before the club folded at the end of the season; after a brief return to indoor soccer with Philadelphia Kixx in 2009–10, he signed with USL Second Division side Charlotte Eagles in 2010.

Gibson was signed to play in the MISL's return to Kansas City with the Missouri Comets on October 16, 2010.  Named the MISL’s Offensive Player of the Month in November, it was Gibson’s move to the Comets’ DEFENSIVE end on New Year’s Eve that provided the club its much-needed spark in the back. Despite playing the first seven games on offense, Gibson still tied for the team lead in blocks with 20, which tied him for 6th overall in the league. Gibson was a tenacious defender, but he was often able to find the back of the net for the Comets, finishing 8th in the league in scoring with 45 points and finishing tied for the second most 3-point goals with four.  As a reward for his efforts, Gibson was named 1st Team All-MISL.

Gibson was named head coach of the Comets on October 29, 2019.

Honors
Kansas City Comets
Major Indoor Soccer League Runners-Up: 2012-13
Major Indoor Soccer League: 2013-14

Individual
All-MISL First Team: 2010-11, 2012-13, 2013-14
All-MISL Second Team: 2011-12
Major Arena Soccer League MVP: 2014-15
All-MASL First Team: 2014-15
All-MASL Second Team: 2015-16, 2021
All-MASL Third Team: 2017-18, 2018-19, 2019-20
Ed Tepper Humanitarian of the Year: 2017-18

References

External links
 Cleveland City Stars bio
 Detroit Ignition bio
 Minnesota Thunder bio

1983 births
Living people
Detroit Ignition players
Association football forwards
Association football midfielders
Liberian footballers
Liberian expatriate footballers
Major Indoor Soccer League (2001–2008) players
Monrovia Black Star FC players
Minnesota Thunder players
Cleveland City Stars players
Charlotte Eagles players
Sportspeople from Monrovia
USL First Division players
USL Second Division players
Missouri Comets players
Philadelphia KiXX (2001–2008 MISL) players
Major Indoor Soccer League (2008–2014) players
Player-coaches
American men's futsal players
Rockford Rampage players
Major Arena Soccer League coaches
American soccer coaches
King Tornado men's soccer players
Major Arena Soccer League players
Association football player-managers